Rohan Campbell is a Canadian actor. He is known for starring as Frank Hardy on the 2020s television series adaptation The Hardy Boys, opposite Alexander Elliot as Joe Hardy, and as Corey Cunningham in the 2022 slasher film Halloween Ends.

Campbell was born in Calgary, and raised in Cochrane, Alberta. His parents are British immigrants. He has also appeared in the television productions Mayerthorpe and Klondike, and on the series Mech-X4, The 100, and iZombie. He moved to Vancouver at seventeen.

Filmography

Film

Television

Awards and nominations

References

External links

21st-century Canadian male actors
1990s births
Canadian male television actors
Living people
Canadian people of British descent